The Monocle may refer to: 

 The Monocle (restaurant) in Washington, D.C.
 The Monocle Laughs, the 1964 French-Italian film